James Marson (1 November 1926 – 1 December 2017) was a French politician.

He was born in Villecresnes. Marson began working at the age of 23 for what later became Alstom. He soon joined the French General Confederation of Labour. Shortly after leaving Alstom for Babcock & Wilcox, Marson became a member of the French Communist Party. Between 1964 and 1969, Marson ran several party academies in Seine-Saint-Denis. He served as mayor of La Courneuve from 1973 to 1996, and was Senator for Seine-Saint-Denis between 1975 and 1986. He died at the age of 91.

References

1926 births
2017 deaths
French Communist Party politicians
Mayors of places in Île-de-France
French Senators of the Fifth Republic
People from Villecresnes
People from Seine-Saint-Denis
Senators of Seine-Saint-Denis